Jakob "Jack" Günthard (8 January 1920 – 7 August 2016) was a Swiss artistic gymnast. He competed at the 1952 Summer Olympics in Helsinki, where he won the gold medal in the horizontal bar, and the silver medal in the team combined exercises. Günthard died in August 2016 at the age of 96.

References

1920 births
2016 deaths
Gymnasts at the 1952 Summer Olympics
Medalists at the 1952 Summer Olympics
Olympic gold medalists for Switzerland
Olympic gymnasts of Switzerland
Olympic medalists in gymnastics
Swiss male artistic gymnasts
Olympic silver medalists for Switzerland
European champions in gymnastics
20th-century Swiss people